Richard "Rich" Hale (born May 17, 1985) is an American mixed martial artist currently competing in the Heavyweight division. A professional since 2006, he is perhaps best known for his 10-fight stint with Bellator MMA, and made it to the finals of the promotions Season Seven Heavyweight and Season Four Light Heavyweight tournaments.

Mixed martial arts career
Hale made his professional debut in December 2006.

Rage in the Cage
Hale started his career fighting for the promotion Rage in the Cage. He has a record of 13 wins and 2 losses in his career under the promotion. He won the Rage in the Cage Heavyweight and Light Heavyweight Championships.

Bellator
In February 2011, Bellator announced that Hale would be a part of the Bellator Season Four Light Heavyweight Tournament and that he would National Champion wrestler Nik Fekete in the quarterfinals.

Hale made his Bellator debut on March 26, 2011 at Bellator 38 where he defeated Nik Fekete via technical submission (inverted triangle choke) to move on to the Light Heavyweight Tournament Quarterfinals.

At Bellator 42, Hale competed in the semi-finals of the Season Four Light Heavyweight Tournament against D.J. Linderman.  Hale won by a narrow split decision to move on to the Light Heavyweight Tournament Finals where he fought Christian M'Pumbu at Bellator 45. He lost via TKO in the third round.

In late 2012, Hale moved up in weight as he joined the Heavyweight Tournament in Bellator's Season Seven. He faced Mike Wessel in the opening quarter-finals at Bellator 75 on October 5, 2012. He won the fight via vicious TKO, stopping his opponent via strikes at just 1:19 into the first round. In the semifinals, he faced Thiago Santos. After being rocked in the first minute of the fight, Hale regained his composure and won the fight via TKO in the first round.

Hale faced Russian Alexander Volkov in the final, with the winner awarded the Bellator Heavyweight Championship. The fight took place at Bellator 84 on December 14, 2012, with Volkov winning by unanimous decision after five rounds.

Hale fought Ryan Martinez at Bellator 96. He was knocked out in the first round by ground and pound from Martinez.

In March 2014, Hale returned to the heavyweight division.  He faced Blagoi Ivanov in the opening round of the Bellator Season Ten Heavyweight Tournament at Bellator 111 on March 7, 2014.  He lost the fight via unanimous decision.

Accomplishments
Bellator MMA
Bellator Season Four Light Heavyweight Tournament Runner-Up
Bellator Season Seven Heavyweight Tournament Runner-Up
Rage in the Cage
RITC Heavyweight Championship (One time)
RITC Light Heavyweight Championship (One time)

Mixed martial arts record

|-
| Win
|align=center| 23–7–1
| Eric Lunsford	
| TKO (strikes)
| Road to ONE: RUF 39
| 
|align=center|1
|align=center|3:11
|Glendale, Arizona, United States
| 
|-
| Win
|align=center| 22–7–1
| Dale Sopi
| Decision (unanimous)
| RUF MMA 36
| 
|align=center|3
|align=center|5:00
|Phoenix, Arizona, United States
| 
|-
| Loss
|align=center| 21–7–1
|Blagoi Ivanov
| Decision (unanimous)
|Bellator 111
|
|align=center|3
|align=center|5:00
|Thackerville, Oklahoma, United States
|
|-
|-
| Loss
|align=center| 21–6–1
|Ryan Martinez
|KO (punches)
|Bellator 96
|
|align=center|1
|align=center|2:19
|Thackerville, Oklahoma, United States
|
|-
| Loss
|align=center| 21–5–1
| Alexander Volkov
| Decision (unanimous)
| Bellator 84
| 
|align=center|5
|align=center|5:00
|Hammond, Indiana, United States
| 
|-
| Win
|align=center| 21–4–1
| Thiago dos Santos
| TKO (punches)
| Bellator 79
| 
|align=center|1
|align=center|3:31
|Rama, Ontario, Canada
| 
|-
| Win
|align=center| 20–4–1
| Mike Wessel
| TKO (punches)
| Bellator 75
| 
|align=center|1
|align=center|1:19
|Hammond, Indiana, United States
| 
|-
| Win
|align=center| 19–4–1
| Josh Burns
| TKO (punches)
| Bellator 69
| 
|align=center|1
|align=center|0:38
|Lake Charles, Louisiana, United States
|Return to Heavyweight.
|-
| Win
|align=center| 18–4–1
| Carlos Flores
| KO (punch)
| Bellator 55
| 
|align=center|1
|align=center|0:18
|Yuma, Arizona, United States
|Catchweight (211 lbs) bout.
|-
| Loss
|align=center| 17–4–1
| Christian M'Pumbu
| TKO (punches)
| Bellator 45
| 
|align=center|3 
|align=center|4:17 
|Lake Charles, Louisiana, United States
| 
|-
| Win
|align=center| 17–3–1
| D.J. Linderman
| Decision (split)
| Bellator 42
| 
|align=center| 3
|align=center| 5:00
|Concho, Oklahoma, United States
| 
|-
| Win
|align=center| 16–3–1
| Nik Fekete
| Technical Submission (inverted triangle choke)
| Bellator 38
| 
|align=center| 1
|align=center| 1:55
|Tunica, Mississippi, United States
| 
|-
| Win
|align=center| 15–3–1
| Dave Mewborn
| TKO (punches)
| Top Combat Championship 3: No Where to Hide
| 
|align=center| 1
|align=center| 3:36
|San Juan, Puerto Rico
|Light Heavyweight debut.
|-
| Win
|align=center| 14–3–1
| Mike Zanski
| Submission (guillotine choke)
| Rage in the Cage 140
| 
|align=center| 3
|align=center| 1:28
|Chandler, Arizona, United States
| 
|-
| Loss
|align=center| 13–3–1
| Antwain Britt
| Decision (majority)
| Vendetta Fighting Championship: A Night of Vengeance
| 
|align=center| 2
|align=center| 5:00
|Oranjestad, Aruba
| 
|-
| Win
|align=center| 13–2–1
| Evan Nedd
| Decision (majority)
| Vendetta Fighting Championship: A Night of Vengeance
| 
|align=center| 2
|align=center| 5:00
|Oranjestad, Aruba
| 
|-
| Win
|align=center| 12–2–1
| Adam Padilla
| TKO (punches)
| Rage in the Cage 130
| 
|align=center| 1
|align=center| 2:12
|Chandler, Arizona, United States
| 
|-
| Draw
|align=center| 11–2–1
| Jordan Smith
| Draw
| Throwdown Showdown 4: Cuatro
| 
|align=center| 5
|align=center| 5:00
|West Valley City, Utah, United States
| 
|-
| Win
|align=center| 11–2
| Rich Beecroft
| TKO (punches)
| Rage in the Cage 125
| 
|align=center| 1
|align=center| 0:33
|Phoenix, Arizona, United States
| 
|-
| Win
|align=center| 10–2
| Shawn Frye
| Submission (rear-naked choke)
| Rage in the Cage 123
| 
|align=center| 1
|align=center| 1:33
|Chandler, Arizona, United States
| 
|-
| Win
|align=center| 9–2
| Matt Lucas
| Submission (kimura)
| Rage in the Cage 121
| 
|align=center| 2
|align=center| 2:03
|Tucson, Arizona, United States
| 
|-
| Win
|align=center| 8–2
| Lyle Steffens
| KO
| Rage in the Cage 119
| 
|align=center| 2
|align=center| 0:44
|Tucson, Arizona, United States
| 
|-
| Win
|align=center| 7–2
| Roger Mejia
| TKO
| Rage in the Cage 117
| 
|align=center| 2
|align=center| 0:16
|Phoenix, Arizona, United States
| 
|-
| Win
|align=center| 6–2
| Adam Padilla
| Submission (rear naked choke)
| Rage in the Cage 116
| 
|align=center| 1
|align=center| 1:01
|Prescott, Arizona, United States
| 
|-
| Win
|align=center| 5–2
| Jeremiah Martinez
| KO (punch)
| Rage in the Cage 113
| 
|align=center| 1
|align=center| 1:01
|Albuquerque, New Mexico, United States
| 
|-
| Loss
|align=center| 4–2
| Matt Lucas
| Decision (unanimous)
| RITC 100: The Centennial
| 
|align=center| 3
|align=center| 3:00
|Fountain Hills, Arizona, United States
| 
|-
| Win
|align=center| 4–1
| Rich Beecroft
| Submission (rear-naked choke)
| Rage in the Cage 97
| 
|align=center| 1
|align=center| 0:25
|Arizona, United States
| 
|-
| Win
|align=center| 3–1
| Steve Sayegh
| Submission (guillotine choke)
| Rage in the Cage 94
| 
|align=center| 2
|align=center| 0:42
|Phoenix, Arizona, United States
| 
|-
| Win
|align=center| 2–1
| Rich Alten
| Submission (rear-naked choke)
| Rage in the Cage 93
| 
|align=center| 2
|align=center| 0:59
|Arizona, United States
| 
|-
| Loss
|align=center| 1–1
| Jimmy Ambriz
| KO (punches)
| Rage in the Cage 91
| 
|align=center| 1
|align=center| 0:53
|Phoenix, Arizona, United States
| 
|-
| Win
|align=center| 1–0
| Wendell Lowe
| Decision (unanimous)
| RITC 89: Triple Main Event
| 
|align=center| 3
|align=center| 3:00
|Maricopa County, Arizona, United States
|

References

External links
 

1985 births
Living people
American male mixed martial artists
American practitioners of Brazilian jiu-jitsu
Light heavyweight mixed martial artists
Heavyweight mixed martial artists
Mixed martial artists utilizing Brazilian jiu-jitsu
Bellator male fighters
Sportspeople from Cleveland